Brasilianthus is a genus of flowering plants belonging to the family Melastomataceae.

Its native range is Northern Brazil.

Species:

Brasilianthus carajensis

References

Melastomataceae
Melastomataceae genera